The 50th Operations Support Squadron (50 OSS) was a United States Space Force unit assigned to Space Operations Command's Space Delta 8. It provided operations support to the delta by leading training, intelligence operations, tactics development. It was headquartered at Peterson Space Force Base, Colorado.

The squadron was inactivated on 8 February 2022 prior to the activation of the 8th Combat Training Squadron.

List of commanders 

 Lt Col Chris D. Crawford, April 2004
 Lt Col William B. Robey, 7 June 2006
 Lt Col Harold Martin, ~2008
 Lt Col Theresa Malasavage, 4 June 2010
 Lt Col Jack D. Fulmer II,  June 2012
 Lt Col Daniel Burtz, 8 July 2014
 Lt Col Timothy Purcell, August 2015
 Lt Col David Gallagher, 26 June 2017
 Lt Col Alan Burwell, 12 July 2019
 Lt Col John Paek, 8 June 2021 – 8 February 2022

See also 
 Space Delta 8

References

External links 
 

Military education and training in the United States
Squadrons of the United States Space Force